The Romani people are also known by a variety of other names; in English as gypsies or gipsies, and Roma; in Greek as  (gíftoi) or  (tsiggánoi), in Central and Eastern Europe as Tsingani (and variants); in France as gitans besides the dated terms bohémiens and manouches; in Italy as rom and sinti besides the dated terms zingari, zigani, and gitani; in Spain as gitanos; and in Portugal as ciganos.

Self-designation also varies: In Central and Eastern Europe, Roma is common. The Romani of England call themselves (in Angloromani) Romanichal, those of Scandinavia (in Scandinavian romanidialect) Romanisæl.
In German-speaking Europe, the self-designation is Sinti, in France Manush, while the groups of Spain, Wales, and Finland use Kalo/Kale (from kalo meaning "black" in Romani language).
There are numerous subgroups and clans with their own self-designations, such as the Kalderash, Machvaya, Boyash, Lovari, Modyar, Xoraxai, Lăutari, etc.

In the English language (according to OED), Rom is a noun (with the plural Romá or Roms) and an adjective, while Romany is also a noun (with the plural Romanies) and an adjective. Both Rom and Romany have been in use in English since the 19th century as an alternative for Gypsy. Romany is also spelled Romani, or Rommany.

Sometimes, rom and romani are spelled with a double r, i.e., rrom and rromani, particularly in Romania in order to distinguish from the Romanian endonym (români), to which it has no relation. This is well established in Romani itself, since it represents a phoneme (/ʀ/ also written as ř and rh) which in some Romani dialects has remained different from the one written with a single r.

Roma is a term primarily used in political contexts to refer to the Romani people as a whole. Still, some subgroups of Romani do not self-identify as Roma, therefore some scholars avoid using the term Roma as not all Romani subgroups accept the term.

Because all Romanies use the word Romani as an adjective, the term began to be used as a noun for the entire ethnic group.

Today, the term Romani is used by some organizations, including the United Nations and the US Library of Congress. However, the Council of Europe and other organizations use the term Roma to refer to Romani people around the world, and recommended that Romani be restricted to the language and culture: Romani language, Romani culture.

Etymology
The demonyms of the Romani people, Lom and Dom share the same etymological origin, reflecting Sanskrit  "a man of low caste, living by singing and music"

The ultimate origin of the Sanskrit term  (perhaps from Munda or Dravidian) is uncertain. Its stem, is connected with drumming,  linked with the Sanskrit verbal root  'to sound (as a drum)', perhaps a loan from Dravidian, e.g. Kannada ḍamāra 'a pair of kettle-drums', and Telugu ṭamaṭama 'a drum, tomtom'.

Gypsy and gipsy

The English term gipsy or gypsy is commonly used to indicate Romani people, Tinkers, and Travellers, and use of the word gipsy in modern-day English is pervasive (and is a legal term under English law—see below), and some Romani organizations use it in their own organizational names, particularly in the United Kingdom. The word, while sometimes positively embraced by Romani persons, is also sometimes rejected by other Romani persons as offensive due to it being tainted by its use as a racial slur and a pejorative connotation implying illegality and irregularity,  and some modern dictionaries either recommend avoiding use of the word gypsy entirely or give it a negative or warning label.

A British House of Commons Committee parliamentary inquiry, as described in their report "Tackling inequalities faced by Gypsy, Roma and Traveller communities" (published 2019), stated about their findings in the United Kingdom that: "We asked many members of the Gypsy, Roma and Traveller communities how they preferred to describe themselves. While some find the term "Gypsy" to be offensive, many stakeholders and witnesses were proud to associate themselves with this term and so we have decided that it is right and proper to use it, where appropriate, throughout the report." 

The Oxford English Dictionary states a 'gipsy' is a  According to the OED, the word was first used in English in 1514, with several more uses in the same century, and both Edmund Spenser and William Shakespeare used this word.

This exonym is sometimes written with a capital letter, to show that it designates an ethnic group. The Spanish term gitano, the French term  and the Basque term  have the same origin.

During the 16th and 17th centuries, the name was written in various ways: Egipcian, Egypcian, gypcian. The word gipsy/gypsy comes from the spellings which had lost the initial capital E, and that is one reason that it is often spelled with the initial g in lowercase. As time elapsed, the notion of "the gipsy/gypsy" altered to include other associated stereotypes such as nomadism and exoticism. John Matthews in The World Atlas of Divination refer to gypsies as "Wise Women."
Colloquially, gipsy/gypsy is used refer to any person perceived by the speaker as fitting the gypsy stereotypes.

Use in English law
Gipsy has several developing and overlapping meanings under English Law. Under the Caravan Sites and Control of Development Act 1960, gipsies are defined as "persons of nomadic habit of life, whatever their race or origin, but does not include members of an organised group of travelling showmen, or persons engaged in travelling circuses, travelling together as such". The definition includes such groups as New Age Travellers as well as Irish Travellers and Romany.

"Gipsies" of Romany origins have been a recognised ethnic group for the purposes of Race Relations Act 1976 since Commission for Racial Equality v Dutton 1989, as have Irish Travellers in England and Wales since O'Leary v Allied Domecq 2000 (having already gained recognition in Northern Ireland in 1997).

List of names

Tsinganoi
In much of continental Europe, Romanies are known by names related to the Greek term :

The Adsincani appear in an 11th-century text preserved in Mt Athos, The Life of Saint George the Athonite (written in the Georgian language), as "a Samaritan people, descendants of Simon the Magician, named Adsincani, who were renowned sorcerers and villains". In the text, emperor Constantine Monomachos employs the Adsincani to exterminate wild animals, who were destroying the game in the imperial park of Philopation.

Bohémiens
Because many Romanies living in France had come via Bohemia, they were referred to as Bohémiens. This term would later be adapted by the French to refer to a particular artistic and impoverished lifestyle of an individual, known as Bohemianism.

Roma 
 (synonym)
 (synonym)
 Coptic language:  Roma
 Japanese:

Other
Albanian: Arixhi (handler of bears)
Arabic:  

Basque: ,  (in the Northern Basque Country),  or txingartu (for Basque-speaking Romanies)
 Chinese:  
 Estonian: 
 Finnish: 
 Georgian:  
 Hebrew:   (from the city Soan in Egypt)
 Mingrelian:

See also
 Didicoy
 Dom people
 List of Romani people
 Lom people
 Lyuli
 Origin of the Romani people
 Romani people by country
 Zott

References

External links
 'gypsy' on the English Wiktionary
 dawn.com
 Names of the Romani People
 Romani words for Romanies and non-Romanies - Ian Hancock
 The Muslim Gypsies in Romania

Romani
Romani